Kabalapatak is the Hungarian name for two villages in Sălaj County, Romania:

Fântânele, a village in Dragu Commune
Fântânele-Rus, a village in Rus Commune